Kees (Cornelis) van Prooijen (born 7 August 1952) is a creator of computer art. Although it does not bear his name, he independently discovered the Bohlen-Pierce scale, a non-octave-repeating scale based on the tritave and spectra containing odd harmonics, in 1978. Van Prooijen came across the scale through an investigation of continued fractions.

He also invented the Kees height, or an "expressibility" measure for complexity of just intonation pitch classes.

Sources

Further reading
 Wolfgang Auhagen, ed. (2005). Science and Music: The Impact of Music: Leopoldina Symposium, Halle/Saale, May 13 to 15, 2004, . Deutsche Akademie der Naturforscher Leopoldina. .

Dutch digital artists
Dutch electronic musicians
Dutch software engineers
Living people
1952 births